Ash Grove Cement Company is a cement manufacturer based in Overland Park, Kansas.  It is the sixth largest cement manufacturer in North America, and was the largest US-owned cement company until it was acquired in 2018 by CRH plc, a global building materials business headquartered in Ireland.

The company was established in 1882 at Ash Grove, Missouri, as the Ash Grove White Lime Association.  It commenced cement manufacture in 1908, with a plant at Chanute, Kansas.  It now has an annual cement manufacturing capacity of nearly 9 million tons, from 9 plants:
Chanute, Kansas 
Durkee, Oregon 
Foreman, Arkansas 
Inkom, Idaho 
Leamington, Utah 
Louisville, Nebraska 
Midlothian, Texas 
Montana City, Montana 
Seattle, Washington 
Branford, Florida
Sumterville, Florida
Mississauga, Ontario
Joliette, Quebec

The company makes Portland cements, fly ash cements, masonry cements, oilwell cements and soil stabilizers.  It also operates a lime plant in Oregon, many ready-mix concrete plants in the Midwest, and a limestone quarry at Blubber Bay, Texada Island, British Columbia.

Recent news
On October 20, 2017, Ash Grove announced that its stockholders had approved a plan for the company to be acquired by CRH plc, a global building materials business headquartered in Ireland.

On June 15, 2018, CRH plc announced that the U.S. Federal Trade Commission had issued its consent order for this transaction, thus completing the acquisition.

References

External links

 
 125th Anniversary Celebration at Louisville, Nebraska plant

Cement companies of the United States
Companies based in Overland Park, Kansas
1882 establishments in Missouri
1908 establishments in Kansas